Lautaro Fernández is an Argentine footballer who plays as a forward for ASD Troina.

References

External links
 

1993 births
Living people
Argentine footballers
Argentine expatriate footballers
Association football forwards
All Boys footballers
Club Atlético Platense footballers
Mons Calpe S.C. players
Primera B Metropolitana players
Primera Nacional players
Argentine Primera División players
Serie D players
Argentine expatriate sportspeople in Italy
Expatriate footballers in Italy
Argentine expatriate sportspeople in Gibraltar
Expatriate footballers in Gibraltar
People from Santa Rosa, La Pampa